{{DISPLAYTITLE:C4H6O5}}
The molecular formula C4H6O5 (molar mass: 134.09 g/mol, exact mass: 134.0215 u) may refer to:

 Diglycolic acid
 Dimethyl dicarbonate (DMDC)
 Malic acid

Molecular formulas